This is the discography of American DJ and producer Matt Lange. Lange has released two studio albums, eleven extended plays, 33 singles, and 46 remixes.

Studio albums

Compilation albums

Extended plays

As lead artist

As Altered Tensions

Singles

Remixes

References

Discographies of American artists
Electronic music discographies